Aleksandra Lisowska (born 12 December 1990) is a Polish long-distance runner. She won the gold medal in the marathon at the 2022 European Athletics Championships.

Lisowska is a five-time Polish national champion.

Career
In 2011, she competed in the women's 3000 m steeplechase event at the European Athletics U23 Championships held in Ostrava, Czech Republic.

Lisowska competed in the women's half marathon at the 2020 World Athletics Half Marathon Championships in Gdynia, Poland, finishing 51st.

In 2021, she represented Poland in the women's marathon at the delayed 2020 Tokyo Olympics, coming home 35th in a time of 2:35:33.

A year later, Lisowska improved her mark from Tokyo by almost seven minutes in claiming the gold medal at the European Athletics Championships held in Munich with a season's best of 2:28:36. Thus, she became only the second Polish female athlete after Wanda Panfil in 1991 to win a major championship title in the women's marathon. Her Munich result would have placed her fourth in Tokyo. Lisowska added bronze in the team category, and led the Polish team to bronze also at the World Military Cross Country Championships in Beja, Portugal in October.

International competitions

Personal bests
 5000 metres – 16:06.90 (Toruń 2020)
 10,000 metres – 32:55.09 (Międzyrzecz 2022)
Road
 10 kilometres – 33:05 (Poznań 2020)
 Half marathon – 1:12:16 (Gdynia 2020)
 Marathon – 2:26:08 (Dębno 2021)

References

External links
 

Living people
1990 births
People from Braniewo
Polish female long-distance runners
Polish female marathon runners
Polish female steeplechase runners
Athletes (track and field) at the 2020 Summer Olympics
Olympic athletes of Poland
21st-century Polish women
European Athletics Championships winners